Mariam Basiladze (born 20 October 1995) is a Georgian footballer who plays as a midfielder. She has been a member of the Georgia women's national team.

References

1995 births
Living people
Women's association football midfielders
Women's footballers from Georgia (country)
Georgia (country) women's international footballers